District 6 of the Texas Senate is a senatorial district that serves a portion of Harris county in the U.S. state of Texas. The seat is currently held by Carol Alvarado, who won a 2018 special election after the resignation of Senator Sylvia Garcia.

Election history 
Election history of District 6 from 1992.

Most recent elections

2004

Previous elections

2002

1998

1994

1992

District officeholders

References

06
Harris County, Texas